Several ships of United States Navy were named USS Flusser for Charles Williamson Flusser:
 The first  was captured in 1864 and sold in 1865.

United States Navy ship names